Byron High School is located on the north side of Byron, Minnesota. It serves students in Byron and parts of neighboring areas. Construction of a new Byron High School building was completed in the fall of 2006.

Curriculum
Byron High School runs on a four period block schedule day offering a wide range of classes including advanced placement, honors, and college level classes through the Challenge Program.

Extracurricular activities
Athletic opportunities include football, boys' and girls' soccer, cross country, track and field, softball, baseball, boys' and girls' basketball, ultimate frisbee, gymnastics, and dance team, among others. Clubs include FRC Robotics, Drama Club, Dungeons and Dragons, FFA, FCCLA, SADD, and National Honor Society. The Byron School District is also starting a new strategic plan.

Awards
Byron High School won the National Blue Ribbon award for school excellence, making it the first school in Southeastern Minnesota to do so. It also won the INTEL award for ingenuity in the classrooms.

References

External links
Byron High School Home Page

Public high schools in Minnesota
School buildings completed in 2006
Schools in Olmsted County, Minnesota
2006 establishments in Minnesota